Cambridge and Bedfordshire North was a constituency of the European Parliament located in the United Kingdom, electing one Member of the European Parliament by the first-past-the-post electoral system. Created in 1984 from parts of Cambridgeshire and Bedfordshire, it was abolished in 1994 and succeeded by Cambridgeshire and Bedfordshire and Milton Keynes.

Boundaries

On its creation in 1984, it consisted of the parliamentary constituencies of Cambridge, Huntingdon, Mid Bedfordshire, North Bedfordshire, North East Cambridgeshire, Peterborough, South East Cambridgeshire and South West Cambridgeshire.

When it was abolished in 1994, the parliamentary constituencies of Cambridge, Huntingdon, North East Cambridgeshire, Peterborough and South West Cambridgeshire became part of the Cambridgeshire constituency, while Mid Bedfordshire and North Bedfordshire were transferred to Bedfordshire and Milton Keynes.

MEPs

Election results

References

External links
 David Boothroyd's United Kingdom Election Results 

European Parliament constituencies in England (1979–1999)
Politics of Cambridgeshire
Politics of Bedfordshire
1984 establishments in England
1994 disestablishments in England
Constituencies established in 1984
Constituencies disestablished in 1994